LNV Ligue A Féminine (LAF) is the top division of French women's volleyball, established in 1941. It is governed by the Ligue Nationale de Volley (LNV), an independent body that runs French professional volleyball under delegation from the French Volleyball Federation (FFVB).
In addition to the usual 14 club participants, the 2018-19 season saw the inclusion of France Avenir 2024, a Toulouse-based development program aimed at nurturing the next generation of French national team players.

Winners list

Winners by club

See also
 LNV Ligue A Masculine

References

External links
Official website
 Ligue Nationale de Volley
 LNV Ligue A Féminine - volleybox.net  

 

France
Volleyball in France
French Women's Volleyball League
Sports leagues established in 1941
1941 establishments in France
Professional sports leagues in France